As a Man Lives is a 1923 American silent drama film directed by J. Searle Dawley and starring Robert Frazer, Gladys Hulette and Frank Losee.

Cast
 Robert Frazer as 	Sherry Mason
 Gladys Hulette as 	Nadia Meredith
 Frank Losee as Dr. Ralph Neyas
 Jack Baston as 	La Chante 
 Alfred E. Wright as 	Henri Camion
 Kate Blancke as 	Mrs. John Mason
 Tiny Belmont as 	Babette
 Charles Sutton as 	Atwill Meredith

References

Bibliography
 Connelly, Robert B. The Silents: Silent Feature Films, 1910-36, Volume 40, Issue 2. December Press, 1998.
 Munden, Kenneth White. The American Film Institute Catalog of Motion Pictures Produced in the United States, Part 1. University of California Press, 1997.

External links
 

1923 films
1923 drama films
1920s English-language films
American silent feature films
Silent American drama films
American black-and-white films
Films directed by J. Searle Dawley
Films set in Paris
1920s American films